Vanån is a river in Sweden and the largest tributary of Västerdal River. The annual open water swimming competition Vansbrosimningen takes place in Vanån (2000 m) and Västerdal River (1000 m).

References

Rivers of Dalarna County